Moonga Simba (born 8 May 2000) is a Swedish football midfielder who plays for GIF Sundsvall on loan from Norwegian club SK Brann.

Club career
On 18 February 2021, Simba signed for Eliteserien club Brann on a three-year contract, being unable to join up with his new team until April due to COVID-19 restrictions.

On 30 March 2022, Simba joined Värnamo on a season-long loan. In February 2023, he joined GIF Sundsvall on loan for the 2023 season.

Personal life
Born in Sweden, Simba is of Congo-Brazzaville descent. His brother Charles, Heradi and Mtaka are also footballers in Sweden.

References

2000 births
Living people
Swedish footballers
Swedish people of Republic of the Congo descent
Sandvikens IF players
Västerås SK Fotboll players
SK Brann players
IFK Värnamo players
GIF Sundsvall players
Swedish expatriate footballers
Expatriate footballers in Norway
Swedish expatriate sportspeople in Norway
Superettan players
Eliteserien players
Association football midfielders